Valérie Karsenti (born 26 August 1968) is a French television, film, stage and voice actress. She is best known for her role as Liliane in the sitcom Scènes de ménages.

Biography 
Valérie Karsenti was born in Pantin in the department of Seine-Saint-Denis. She started at the age of 15 taking acting classes before joining the National School of Arts and Theater (ENSATT). She was still a student when Jean-Louis Thamin hired her to play in L'Étourdi with Roland Blanche and Jean-Pierre Lorit.

After leaving the ENSATT in 1988, she later portrayed important roles in television films such as Sniper and Édouard et ses filles. Since 1990, her career began to focus on theater, with her taking roles in Camus, Sartre et les autres, Colombe with Geneviève Page and Jean-Paul Roussillon, and Accalmies passagères, which received the Molière Award for best comedy show in 1997. She later played in Un fil à la patte and Un petit jeu sans conséquence, 5 Molière Awards and best private show in 2003.

At that time, she appeared again on television and cinema, especially with Bertrand Blier and Lisa Azuelos. She continued doing theatre work like Comme en 14, 3 Molière Awards and one for best public show in 2004, Le Prince travesti, Exit the King with Michel Bouquet, 2 Molière Awards and one for best private show in 2005, and Adultères with Pascale Arbillot.

Since 2009, she plays the role of Liliane in the sitcom Scènes de ménages, broadcast every day on channel M6. That year, she was chosen by Mabrouk El Mechri to play one of the leading roles in Maison Close, the new TV Series broadcast on Canal+.

Filmography

Theater

Dubbing

External links

 

1968 births
Living people
French film actresses
French television actresses
French stage actresses
French voice actresses
French video game actresses
People from Pantin